Pseudoclivina is a genus of beetles in the family Carabidae, containing the following species:

 Pseudoclivina assamensis (Putzeys, 1846)
 Pseudoclivina australiana Baehr, 2008
 Pseudoclivina bohemani (Putzeys, 1861)
 Pseudoclivina calida (Putzeys, 1867)
 Pseudoclivina costata (Andrewes, 1929)
 Pseudoclivina grandis (Dejean, 1826)
 Pseudoclivina mandibularis (Dejean, 1831)
 Pseudoclivina memnonia (Dejean, 1831)
 Pseudoclivina muelleriana (Kult, 1959)
 Pseudoclivina puchneri Dostal, 2012
 Pseudoclivina senegalensis (Dejean, 1831)
 Pseudoclivina testacea (Putzeys, 1846)

References

Scaritinae